Elijah Hise (July 4, 1802 – May 8, 1867) was a United States diplomat and U.S. Representative from the  of Kentucky.

Hise was born July 4, 1802 in Allegheny County, Pennsylvania before moving with his parents, Frederick and Nancy (Eckstein) Hise, to Russellville, Kentucky when young. He completed preparatory studies and then attended Transylvania University, Lexington, Kentucky. He studied law and was admitted to the bar and commenced practice.

Hise was a member of the Kentucky House of Representatives in 1829. He was an unsuccessful Democratic candidate for Lieutenant Governor in 1836. He served as the Chargé d'Affaires to Guatemala, January 31, 1849 – June 23, 1849. In addition, he was the chief justice of the Court of Appeals of Kentucky.

Hise was elected as a Democrat to the Thirty-ninth Congress to fill the vacancy caused by the death of Henry Grider, and he was reelected to the Fortieth Congress. In all he served from December 3, 1866, until his death by suicide on May 8, 1867 in Russellville, Kentucky. He left behind a suicide note in which he rued "the impending disaster and ruin [of the country] in which despotic and unconstitutional rule has involved her." He was buried in Maple Grove Cemetery.

The town of Hiseville, Kentucky was named in honor of the congressman.

See also
List of United States Congress members who died in office (1790–1899)

References

1802 births
1867 deaths
People from Allegheny County, Pennsylvania
Democratic Party members of the Kentucky House of Representatives
Ambassadors of the United States to Guatemala
Transylvania University alumni
Kentucky lawyers
People from Russellville, Kentucky
19th-century American diplomats
Democratic Party members of the United States House of Representatives from Kentucky
Judges of the Kentucky Court of Appeals
19th-century American politicians
19th-century American judges
19th-century American lawyers